The 2021–22 Uganda Tri-Nation Series, also known as the Pearl of Africa T20I Series, was a Twenty20 International (T20I) cricket tournament that was held in Uganda in September 2021. The participating teams were the hosts Uganda, along with Kenya and Nigeria. The tournament was originally planned to consist of 13 T20I matches, with the sides facing each other four times in a round-robin stage, followed by a final between the top two teams. The round-robin was later reduced by three matches with each team facing each other three times. The tournament provided preparation for all sides ahead of T20 World Cup Africa Qualifier events took place in October and November 2021.

Ahead of the T20I tournament, Uganda and Kenya played a three-match 50-over series in preparation for Cricket World Cup Challenge League events scheduled later in 2021.

Kenya defeated their hosts in the first unofficial One Day International (ODI), recording a comfortable win by 78 runs. Uganda levelled the series by winning the second game by 9 wickets after bowling out the visitors for only 85 runs. Uganda won the third match by 3 wickets to claim the series 2–1.

Uganda defeated Kenya by 6 runs in the final of the T20I tournament.

Squads

On 12 September 2021 Cricket Uganda announced that Deusdedit Muhumuza would take over as captain for the remainder of the tournament after Brian Masaba withdrew from the squad due to injury.

Unofficial ODI series

1st unofficial ODI match

2nd unofficial ODI match

3rd unofficial ODI match

T20I tournament

Points table

Fixtures

Final

Notes

References

External links
 Series home (unofficial ODIs) at ESPNcricinfo
 Series home (T20I series) at ESPNcricinfo

Associate international cricket competitions in 2021–22